The 2000 Coupe de France Final was a football match held at Stade de France, Saint-Denis on 7 May 2000 that saw FC Nantes Atlantique defeat the surprising amateur team of Calais RUFC from CFA 2–1 thanks to two goals by Antoine Sibierski.

Match details

See also
1999–2000 Coupe de France

References

External links
Coupe de France results at Rec.Sport.Soccer Statistics Foundation
Report on French federation site

Coupe de France Final
2000
Coupe De France Final 2000
Coupe de France Final
Sport in Saint-Denis, Seine-Saint-Denis
Coupe de France Final